Melisa A. Moses (born February 28, 1972) is a former American diver. Born in Jacksonville, Florida, she competed in the women's 3 metre springboard event at the 1996 Summer Olympics, finishing in fourth place.

References

External links

1972 births
Living people
Divers at the 1996 Summer Olympics
American female divers
Olympic divers of the United States
Sportspeople from Jacksonville, Florida
Pan American Games medalists in diving
Pan American Games silver medalists for the United States
Divers at the 1995 Pan American Games
Medalists at the 1995 Pan American Games
20th-century American women
21st-century American women